Driffield Rugby Club is an English rugby union club based in Driffield, East Yorkshire. The first XV team plays in Regional 1 North East, having been promoted into tier five following the league restructuring at the end of the 2021-22 season.

Honours
Yorkshire 1 champions: 1991/92, 2012–13

References

Official website
https://www.driffieldrufc.com

English rugby union teams
Driffield
Sport in the East Riding of Yorkshire